Julián Vázquez (born March 30, 2001) is a professional footballer who plays as a winger. Born in the United States, he represented the Mexico national under-20 team.

Career

Professional 
On October 7, 2018, Vázquez signed as a Homegrown Player for Real Salt Lake of Major League Soccer.

Vázquez made his professional debut on June 11, 2019, appearing as an 84th-minute substitute during a 3–0 loss to Los Angeles FC in the Lamar Hunt US Open Cup.

Vázquez was released by Salt Lake following their 2020 season.

In May 2021, Vázquez joined USL Championship side Las Vegas Lights.

Vázquez signed with MLS Next Pro side Sporting Kansas City II on February 18, 2022.

Honors 
Real Monarchs
USL Championship Cup: 2019

References

External links 
 
 Real Salt Lake Julian Vazquez  Real Salt Lake

2001 births
Living people
People from Brigham City, Utah
Mexican footballers
Mexico youth international footballers
American soccer players
American sportspeople of Mexican descent
Association football forwards
Real Salt Lake players
Real Monarchs players
USL Championship players
Soccer players from Utah
Homegrown Players (MLS)
Las Vegas Lights FC players
Sporting Kansas City II players
MLS Next Pro players